Jonas Geissler (born 5 June 1984) is a German politician of the Christian Social Union (CSU) who has been serving as a member of the Bundestag since 2021.

Early life and education
Geissler was born 1984 in the West German town of Isny. He received a PhD from the University of Erlangen–Nuremberg.

Political career
Geissler was elected directly to the Bundestag in 2021, representing the Coburg district. He has since been serving on the Committee on Transport and the Committee on Human Rights and Humanitarian Aid.

Other activities

Government agencies
 Federal Network Agency for Electricity, Gas, Telecommunications, Posts and Railway (BNetzA), Alternate Member of the Rail Infrastructure Advisory Council (since 2022)
 German Institute for Human Rights (DIMR), Member of the Board of Trustees (since 2022)

Non-profit organizations
 Coburg University of Applied Sciences, Member of the Board of Trustees (since 2022)

References 

Living people
1984 births
Christian Social Union in Bavaria politicians
Members of the Bundestag 2021–2025
21st-century German politicians